Lithops gesineae is a species of the genus Lithops under the family Aizoaceae. It is native to Southern Africa.

Description 
Lithops gesineae is a succulent plant with leaves that grow in pairs. The leaves are gray or brown with tinges of green, and have spots of brown or darker color on the top. Flowers are yellow.

References 

gesineae